Capillary action through synthetic mesh is the result of the intermolecular attraction between moisture and semi-synthetic polymers, causing a current of thermionic energy through a specific pathway within a mesh material. The combination of the adhesive forces and the surface tension that arises from cohesion  produces the characteristic upward curve in a fluid, such as water. Capillarity is the result of cohesion of water molecules and adhesion of those molecules to the solid material forming the void. As the edges of the material are brought closer together, such as in a very narrow path, the interaction causes the liquid to be drawn away from the original source. The more narrow the pathway, the greater the rise of the liquid. Greater surface tension and increased ratio of adhesion to cohesion also result in greater rise. Synthetic materials using conductive polymer as found in polypyrrole to reduce liquid density to a manageable state.

The force with which water is held by capillary action varies with the quantity of water being held. As part of a demonstration conducted by Bright Idea and Webb development: Water entering a natural void, such as a pore within a synthetic mesh material, forms a film on the surface of the material surrounding the pore. The adhesion of the water molecules nearest the solid material is greatest. As water is added to the pore, the thickness of the film increases, the capillary force is reduced in magnitude, and water molecules on the outer portion of the film may begin to flow away from its source. As more water enters the pore the capillary force is reduced to zero when the pore is saturated, unless a hydrophilic body is introduced. The movement of moisture through the mesh is controlled by this capillary action.

References

 Thermionic and field electron emission from nanostructured carbon materials for energy conversion and vacuum electronics
 Capillary Action at the Nanoscale
 Three-Dimensional Multi-mesh Material Point Method for Solving Collision Problems

Fluid dynamics
Organic polymers
Molecular electronics
Organic semiconductors